Petrina is a surname. Notable people with the surname include:

 Carlotta Petrina (1901–1997), American illustrator and printer
 Nicola Petrina (1861–1909), Italian politician
 Stipe Petrina (born 1954), Croatian politician

See also 
 Petrina (disambiguation)
 Petrina (given name)

Surnames of Italian origin
Italian-language surnames